Volešák is a Czech surname. Notable people with the surname include:

 Ladislav Volešák (born 1984), Czech footballer
 Miloš Volešák (born 1984), Slovak footballer

Czech-language surnames